Justin Hayward and Friends Sing the Moody Blues Classic Hits is an album by Justin Hayward of The Moody Blues with the Frankfurt Rock Orchestra and Michael Sadler of Saga and Shaun Williamson as guest-singers. It's an album of tracks taken from the Moody Blues discography, played with orchestral arrangements with lead vocal duties being taken in turn by Hayward, Sadler, and Williamson.

It was originally released with a cover title of Moody Blues – Unplugged – Greatest Hits in 1996 on Phantom Sound & Vision. A 1997 release by ISBA was titled Justin Hayward and Friends Sing the Moody Blues Classic Hits while a 2003 release on Armou was titled Justin Hayward and Friends and the Frankfort Rock Orchestra Perform the Hits of the Moody Blues.

Allmusic described the album as uninteresting and mostly plodding, with Hayward "becoming the Engelbert Humperdinck of 1960s rock crooners".

Track listing
All songs written by Justin Hayward except "Isn't Life Strange" and "I'm Just a Singer (In a Rock and Roll Band)" written by John Lodge and "Forever Autumn" written by Jeff Wayne, Gary Osborne and Paul Vigrass.

 "Nights in White Satin" (Michael Sadler – Vocals)
 "Question" (Shaun Williamson – Vocals)
 "Forever Autumn" (Justin Hayward – Vocals)
 "I Know You're Out There Somewhere" (Shaun Williamson – Vocals)
 "Running Water" (Justin Hayward – Vocals)
 "New Horizons" (Michael Sadler – Vocals)
 "Blue World" (Justin Hayward – Vocals)
 "Isn't Life Strange" (Shaun Williamson – Vocals)
 "The Voice (Michael Sadler – Vocals)
 "Blue Guitar" (Justin Hayward – Vocals)
 "I'm Just a Singer (In a Rock and Roll Band)" (Shaun Williamson – Vocals)
 "Voices in the Sky" (Justin Hayward – Vocals)
 "Your Wildest Dreams" (Michael Sadler – Vocals)
 "In My World" (Justin Hayward – Vocals)

Personnel
 Justin Hayward – Vocals (tracks 3, 5, 7, 10, 12, 14)
 Michael Sadler – Vocals (tracks 1, 6, 9, 13)
 Shaun Williamson – Vocals (tracks 2, 4, 8, 11)
 Lutz Halfter – Drums, Percussion
 Thomas Simmerl – Drums, Percussion
 Michael Lakatos – Percussion
 Hans-Dieter Lorenz – Bass
 Johannes Luley – Guitar
 Thomas Lohr – Guitar
 Lutz Sommer – Guitar
 Dietmar Watchler – Pedal Steel Guitar
 Tommy Schmitt-Zijnen – Keyboards
 Frankfurt Rock Orchestra – Orchestra
 Leon Ives – Orchestral arrangements

References

Justin Hayward albums
2003 live albums
Symphonic rock albums
The Moody Blues tribute albums